Two ships of the Royal Australian Navy (RAN) have been named HMAS Hawkesbury, after the Hawkesbury River in New South Wales.

 , a  launched in 1943, decommissioned in 1947, recommissioned in 1952, and decommissioned for the second time in 1955
 , a  launched in 1998 and commissioned but in reserve as of 2016

Battle honours 

Ships named HMAS Hawkesbury are entitled to carry three battle honours:

 Pacific 1944–45
 New Guinea 1944
 Borneo 1945

See also 

 , a Canadian  from World War II.

References 

Royal Australian Navy ship names